Events in the year 1982 in Belgium.

Incumbents
 Monarch: Baudouin
 Prime Minister: Wilfried Martens

Events
 8 May – Gilles Villeneuve dies in a crash at Circuit Zolder qualifying for the 1982 Belgian Grand Prix
 30 September – Brabant killers shoot and kill a policeman while robbing a gun dealer in Wavre
 10 October – Municipal elections

Publications
 OECD, Economic Surveys, 1981–1982: Belgium, Luxembourg.
 H. Lemaitre, Les gouvernements belges de 1968 à 1980: processus de crise (Stavelot, J. Chauveheid)

Births

 2 January – Hassan Mourhit, athlete
 4 January – Mélanie Cohl, singer
 26 February – Rose Berryl, writer
 15 April – Marie Kremer, actress
 30 April – Pascaline Crêvecoeur, actress
 1 June – Justine Henin, tennis player
 24 July – Élise Crombez, model
 28 July – Jonas Geirnaert, cartoonist
 6 August – Kevin van der Perren, figure skater
 31 August – Thomas van den Balck, hockey player
 18 September – Maxime Luycx, hockey player
 26 September – Axel Hirsoux, singer
 4 October – Lola Danhaive, hockey player
 9 October – Laurent Micheli, director
 7 November – Mahinur Ozdemir, politician
 9 December – Nathalie De Vos, athlete
 10 December - Mélanie Martins, singer
 17 December – Virginie Claes, beauty queen

Deaths
 5 February – Wies Moens (born 1898), activist
 2 April – Max de Vaucorbeil (born 1901), film director
 7 April – Frédéric Bremer (born 1892), neurophysiologist
 14 May – Marcel-Henri Jaspar (born 1901), politician
 8 August – Ferre Grignard (born 1939), singer
 10 August – Sim Viva (born 1903), singer and actress
 17 August – Camille Bulcke (born 1909), missionary
 9 October – Omer Becu (born 1902), trade unionist
 18 October – Maurice Gilliams (born 1900), writer
 4 November – Mireille Versele (born 1956), cystic fibrosis campaigner
 25 November – Léon Vleurinck (born 1899), rower
 3 December – Gaston Mesmaekers (born 1888), equestrian

References

 
1980s in Belgium
20th century in Belgium
Events in Belgium
Deaths in Belgium